The Executive Council of Zürich is the executive organ of the canton of Zürich, in Switzerland.  Zürich has a seven-member Executive Council.

Members

Notes

See also
 Cantonal Council of Zürich
 List of cantonal executives of Switzerland

External links
 Executive Council official webpage

Politics of the canton of Zürich
Zurich